Kadoma Central is a constituency of the National Assembly of the Parliament of Zimbabwe. Located in the town of Kadoma, Mashonaland West Province, it is currently represented by Muchineripi Chinyanganya of the Movement for Democratic Change Alliance. An older constituency, Gatooma (the town's colonial name), was represented in the Parliament of Rhodesia between 1928 and 1979.

Members 
Note: In the 1985 and 2005 elections, the constituency was known simply as Kadoma.

References 

Kadoma District
Mashonaland West Province
Parliamentary constituencies in Zimbabwe